Karłowice Wielkie  is a village in the administrative district of Gmina Kamiennik, within Nysa County, Opole Voivodeship, in south-western Poland.

Before 1945 the town was called Gross Carlowitz, part of Silesia in Germany (see Territorial changes of Poland after World War II).

References

Villages in Nysa County